Peter Scott (born 19 January 1997) is an English field hockey player who plays as a midfielder or forward for Wimbledon and the England national team.

Club career
Scott plays club hockey in the Men's England Hockey League Premier Division for Wimbledon, whom he joined from Reading for the 2020-21 season.

He has also played for Team Bath Buccaneers and Bracknell HC.

International career
Scott made his senior international debut for England v Germany on 4 March 2017.

References

External links

Profile on England Hockey

1997 births
Living people
English male field hockey players
Wimbledon Hockey Club players
Men's England Hockey League players
Reading Hockey Club players
Team Bath Buccaneers Hockey Club players